The 1975 North Atlantic earthquake occurred on May 26 at 09:11 UTC. The epicenter was located in the North Atlantic, in an area between the Azores, Iberian Peninsula, and Morocco. It had a magnitude of Mw 7.9, or Ms 8.1.

This was an intraplate earthquake that was located about 200 km south of the Gloria Fault, the  presumed boundary between the African Plate and the Eurasia Plate. It had a right-lateral strike-slip focal mechanism and was unusually large for an oceanic strike-slip event. Damage was reported in Madeira, which is about 250 km away. A tsunami of 0.3 m in maximum water elevation was recorded in Lagos, Portugal and an eyewitness reported a  wave height at Ponta Delgada in the Azores.

See also
List of earthquakes in 1975

References

External links

North Atlantic earthquake, 1975
1975 tsunamis